Michael Grant McKillop (born 24 April 1981) is a Zimbabwean first-class cricketer and field hockey player who also served as the captain of the Zimbabwe men's national field hockey team. He has played for Matabeleland team in nine first-class cricket matches.

Personal life 
His Step-father, Collin Williams was a Zimbabwean first-class cricketer and a former field hockey coach and his mother, Patricia McKillop is a Zimbabwean woman field hockey player who was also a key member of the Zimbabwean field hockey team which claimed gold medal at the 1980 Summer Olympics. His step brother, Sean Williams is also a cricketer who later went onto play international cricket for Zimbabwe since 2005 while Matthew Williams his fellow step brother is also a first-class cricketer playing for Matabeleland Tuskers.

References

External links 

1981 births
Living people
Zimbabwean cricketers
Zimbabwean male field hockey players
Matabeleland cricketers
White Zimbabwean sportspeople
Cricketers from Bulawayo